Alberto Entrerrios (born 7 November 1976 in Gijón, Asturias) is a Spanish former professional handball player.

He is 192 cm tall and weighs 102 kg. He spent 10 seasons (2002–2012) playing for BM Ciudad Real and 1 season (2011–2012) for BM Atlético de Madrid.He has won the Champions League title with BM Ciudad Real, together with two World Championships (Tunisia 2005 and Spain 2013) with the Spanish national team. He accounts for 225 international matches with Spain, which makes him a seasoned international handball player.

His brother Raúl Entrerríos is also a Spanish international handball player.

Honours
As a player
 Spain National European handball team (225 caps)
 EHF Champions League winner: 2006, 2008, 2009
 Winner of the Spanish League: 2004, 2007, 2008, 2009, 2010
 2013 World Championship All-Star Team

As a coach
 Best Coach of EHF Champions League: 2021

External links
 BM Atlético profile
 EHFCL website

References

1976 births
Living people
Sportspeople from Gijón
Spanish male handball players
Liga ASOBAL players
Handball players at the 2008 Summer Olympics
Olympic handball players of Spain
Olympic bronze medalists for Spain
CB Ademar León players
BM Ciudad Real players
Olympic medalists in handball
Medalists at the 2008 Summer Olympics
Real Grupo de Cultura Covadonga sportsmen